YPP is an initialism that may stand for:

 Yohoho! Puzzle Pirates
 Permai Education Foundation
 Youth Parliament Program, in India
 Yes People's Party, in Ghana
 Young People's Party (Sierra Leone)
 Young Progressives Party, Nigeria